Legislative elections were held in New Caledonia on 8 February 1953.

Background
The elections were originally scheduled for March 1952. Following amendments to the territory's electoral law approved in the first reading by the French Parliament in late 1951, the number of members of the General Council was increased to 25, 16 of which were to be elected by Europeans and nine by Kanaks. At the time, the voter roll included around 10,000 European voters and around 8,000 Kanak voters who met educational requirements to register to vote. However, on the second reading of the bill, the proposed amendments were rejected by 356–256 in the National Assembly following a campaign by the territory's MP Maurice Lenormand, who demanded a common electoral roll. The bill was referred to a committee, but due to a government crisis, dealing with the issue was repeatedly postponed.

The term of the sitting Council had expired on 19 January 1952, leaving no elected replacement. The Chairman of the outgoing General Council Henri Bonneaud flew to France to request its term be extended, which was approved by a vote of 325–198 in the National Assembly. However, when it emerged that around 100 of the votes in favour had come from Communist Party MPs, all-but-one of the members of the General Council refused to continue sitting and handed in their resignation to the Governor on 19 May.

Electoral system
A decree in 1952 created a single electoral roll and divided the territory into five constituencies. Seats were elected by panachage and preferential voting.

By the time of the election, the voter roll consisted of 10,511 Europeans and 9,832 Kanaks.

Results
Fifteen of the 25 seats were won by left-wing candidates led by Lenormand (including nine Kanaks) that became the Caledonian Union, eight by right-wing candidates from a bloc led by Bonneaud, and two by other candidates. Three pro-Charles de Gaulle candidates were all defeated.

Elected members

Aftermath
A by-election was held on 12 September 1954 after Maurice Bichon gave up his seat in the South constituency following his appointment as Paymaster General of Conakry. The election was won by the Lenormand group candidate Armand Ohlen, who defeated Roger Rolland of the Bonneaud group by 1,568 votes to 1,286.

References

New Caledonia
1953 in New Caledonia
Elections in New Caledonia
Election and referendum articles with incomplete results
February 1953 events in Oceania